Georgios Marsellos (born 12 October 1936) is a Greek former hurdler who competed in the 1960 Summer Olympics and in the 1964 Summer Olympics.

References

1936 births
Living people
Greek male hurdlers
Olympic athletes of Greece
Athletes (track and field) at the 1960 Summer Olympics
Athletes (track and field) at the 1964 Summer Olympics
Mediterranean Games gold medalists for Greece
Mediterranean Games medalists in athletics
Athletes (track and field) at the 1959 Mediterranean Games
Athletes from Athens
20th-century Greek people